The Valley Beat was an alternative weekly newspaper based  Allentown, Pennsylvania, in the Lehigh Valley area of eastern Pennsylvania. It folded in early 2015.

See also
Media in the Lehigh Valley

References

External links
 Official Site (offline, archive.org backup)
 E-Editions on Issuu

Alternative weekly newspapers published in the United States
Mass media in Allentown, Pennsylvania
Defunct newspapers published in Pennsylvania